Shizong may refer to:

Locations
Shizong County (师宗县), a county in Yunnan, China
Shizong Town (十总镇), a town in Nantong, Jiangsu, China

People

Shizong is an imperial temple name accorded to several Chinese monarchs. It may refer to:

 Liu Che (156–87 BC, reigned 141–87 BC), also known as Emperor Wu, Han dynasty emperor
 Sima Shi (208–255), Cao Wei regent, posthumously honored as Shizong of the Jin dynasty (266–420)
 Zhouhezhu (周曷朱) ( 3rd century), father of Shi Le, posthumously honored as Shizong of Later Zhao
 Fu Jian (317–355) (reigned 351–355), also known as Emperor Gaozu and Emperor Jingming, Former Qin's founding emperor
 Zhang Chonghua (327–353, reigned 346–353), Former Liang ruler
 Murong De (336–405, reigned 398–405), also known as Emperor Xianwu, Southern Yan's founding emperor
 Xiao Zhangmao (458–493), Southern Qi crown prince, posthumously honored as Shizong of Southern Qi
 Yuan Ke (483–515, reigned 499–515), also known as Emperor Xuanwu, Northern Wei emperor
 Gao Cheng (521–549), Eastern Wei regent, posthumously honored as Shizong of Northern Qi
 Yuwen Yu (534–560, reigned 557–560), also known as Emperor Ming, Northern Zhou emperor
 Xiao Kui (542–585, reigned 562–585), also known as Emperor Ming, Western Liang emperor
 Yang Zhao (584–606), Sui dynasty crown prince, posthumously honored as Shizong of Sui
 Qian Yuanguan (887–941, reigned 932–941), ruler of Wuyue
 Yelü Ruan (918–951, reigned 947–951), Liao dynasty emperor
 Chai Rong (921–959, reigned 954–959), Later Zhou emperor
 Wanyan Yong (1123–1189, reigned 1161–1189), emperor of the Jin dynasty (1115–1234)
 Zhu Houcong (1507–1567, reigned 1521–1567), also known as Jiajing Emperor, Ming dynasty emperor
 Yinzhen (1678–1735, reigned 1723–1735), also known as Yongzheng Emperor, Qing dynasty emperor

See also
Thế Tông — Vietnamese equivalent
Sejong — Korean equivalent

Temple name disambiguation pages